The 2011 Women's U25 Wheelchair Basketball World Championship was held at the Walker Complex at Brock University in St. Catharines, Ontario, Canada, from 15 to 21 July 2011. It was the first ever wheelchair basketball world championship for women in the under-25 age category. The event was run by Wheelchair Basketball Canada in partnership with Brock University. Eight nations competed: Australia, Canada, Germany, Great Britain, Japan, Mexico, South Africa and the United States. The event took the form of a round-robin tournament, with each team playing all the other teams once. The top eight teams then went into quarter-finals, while the bottom two played each other for world ranking. The winners of the semi-finals faced each other in the final, while the losers played for bronze. The championship was won by the United States; Australia came second and Great Britain third.

Competition

The 2011 Women's U25 Wheelchair Basketball World Championship as the first ever wheelchair basketball world championship for women in the under-25 age category. The event was run by Wheelchair Basketball Canada in partnership with Brock University on behalf of the International Wheelchair Basketball Federation. (IWBF) Wheelchair Basketball Canada is a non-profit, charitable organization that is the national governing body of the sport in Canada, and the Canadian member of the IWBF. The event organisers hoped to raise the profile of the sport in Canada, and boost Canada's (ultimately successful) bid for the 2014 Women's World Wheelchair Basketball Championship.

Venue
The event was held at the Walker Complex at Brock University in St. Catharines, Ontario, Canada. Games were played at the Bob Davis Gym, normally home to the Brock Badgers Basketball, Volleyball and Wrestling teams. The gym had  of space and seating for 1,000 spectators.

Teams
Eight nations competed: Australia, Canada, Germany, Great Britain, Japan, Mexico, South Africa and the United States.

Head Coach: Gerry HewsonAssistant Coach: Alison MoselyAssistant Coach: Matthew DunstanTeam Manager: Jane KylePhysiotherapist: Paula Peralta

Source:

Head coach: Michael Broughton Assistant coach:  Marni Abbott-PeterAssistant coach: Karla Tritten Team Manager:  Kathy LudwigAthletic Therapist:  Teresa Hussey

Source:

Head coach: Heidi KirsteCoach: Holger GlinickiTeam manager:  Lisa KöslingDoctor:  Juergen VöelpelPhysiotherapist:  Tim Töllner

Source:

Head coach: Jennifer Browning Assistant coach: James FisherTeam manager: Garry PeelPhysiotherapist: Lisa Wiles

Source:

Head coach: Kaori TachibanaAssistant coach:Makiko HaradaAssistant coach:Mina HirokiTeam Manager: Miho SugiyamaPhysiotherapist: Toshihiro WakuiGeneral manager: Yoshikazu Noguchi  

Source:

Head coach: Heriberto EscalonaAssistant coach: Ulises MenéndezManager: Sergio DurandTeam doctor: Eduardo De Garay

Source:

Head coach: Willie MulderAssistant coach:Victor AndriessenTeam Manager: Yoliswa LumkaPhysiotherapist: Yamisha Nathalal 

Source:

Head coach: Stephanie WheelerAssistant coach: Dan PriceAssistant coach: Dan PriceManager: Matthew BuchiTeam leader: 
Jessica ServaisATC:Karla Wessels

Source:

Preliminary round

Playoff round

 Quarter-Final 1

 Quarter-Final 2

 Quarter-Final 3

 Quarter-Final 4

 5/8 Crossover 1

 5/8 Crossover 2

 Semi-Final 1

 Semi-Final 2

Championship round

 7th/8th place game

 5th/6th place game

 Bronze medal match

 Gold medal match

MVP and All Stars
Awards were presented on the final day:

All Star Five
 Jamey Jewells (1.0)  (Canada)
 Rebecca Murray (2.5) (United States)
 Cindy Ouellet (3.5)  (Canada)
 Mari Amimoto (4.5) (Japan)
 Maya Lindholm (2.0)  (Germany)

Most Valuable Player
 Desiree Miller (3.5) (United States)

True sports
Each team was asked to nominate an individuals from their team who exemplified the principles of true sport. The nominees were:

 Carmen Huisamen  (4.5) (South Africa)
 Mareike Adermann (4.5) (Germany)
 Chihiro Kitada (4.5) (Japan)
 Floralia Estrada  (4.0) (Mexico)
 Alarissa Haak (2.0) (Canada)
 Ella Sabljak (1.0) (Australia)
 Gail Gaeng (3.5) (United States)

Notes

External links
 
   

Women's U25 Wheelchair Basketball World Championship
International women's basketball competitions hosted by Canada
2011–12 in Canadian basketball
2011 in women's basketball
2011 in wheelchair basketball
Wheelchair basketball in Canada
Brock University